Repišće is a naselje (settlement) in the municipality of Klinča Sela, Zagreb County, Croatia.

Population

References 

Populated places in Zagreb County